Sennaya Ploshchad:

 Sennaya Ploshchad (St. Petersburg)
 Sennaya Ploshchad (Nizhny Novgorod)
 Sennaya Ploshchad (Veliky Novgorod)
 Sennaya Ploshchad (Moscow)
 Smolenskaya-Sennaya Square
 Sennaya Ploshchad (St. Petersburg Metro)
 Sennaya Ploshchad (Nizhny Novgorod Metro)